Edwin Eugene Parry (March 11, 1885 – November 30, 1966) was an American football player and coach. He served as the head football coach at Oklahoma Agricultural and Mechanical College, now Oklahoma State University–Stillwater, for one season, in 1908, compiling a record of 4–4.

Head coaching record

References

External links
 

1885 births
1966 deaths
American football tackles
Chicago Maroons football players
Oklahoma State Cowboys football coaches
People from Albia, Iowa